Meixian Tsang Hin-chi Stadium is a multi-purpose stadium in Meixian District, Meizhou, Guangdong, China. It was opened in 2012 with capacity of 20,221.

The stadium is named after Meixian-born Hong Kong charitarian Tsang Hin-chi, who donated ¥15 million for construction of the stadium.

References

Football venues in China
Athletics (track and field) venues in China
Sports venues in Guangdong
Multi-purpose stadiums in China